Cryptolectica ensiformis is a moth of the family Gracillariidae. It is known from China (Hainan), India, Indonesia (Sulawesi), Japan (Tusima, the Ryukyu Islands, Honshū, Kyūshū, Shikoku) and Thailand.

The wingspan is 9.2–11 mm.

The larvae feed on Quercus acuta and Quercus sessilifolia. They probably mine the leaves of their host plant.

References

Acrocercopinae
Moths of Asia
Moths of Japan
Moths described in 1986